This is the list of all the flags used and being used in Nepal.

National flags

Flags used during the unification campaign

Royal flags

City

Historical flags

Political flags

References 

National symbols of Nepal
Lists and galleries of flags
Flags